Olja is a feminine given name and nickname. It may refer to:

Given name
 Olja Bećković (born 1964), Serbian journalist, actress and television presenter
 Olja Ivanjicki (1931–2009), Serbian painter, sculptor and poet
 Olja Knežević (born 1968), Croatia-based Montenegrin novelist
 Olja Petrović (politician) (born 1990), Serbian politician
 Olja Savičević (born 1974), Croatian novelist, poet and playwright

Nickname
 Olivera Ćirković (born 1969), Serbian writer, painter, former convicted jewel thief and former basketball player and administrator
 Ognjen Petrović (1948–2000), Serbian football goalkeeper

See also
 Olha, another given name

Feminine given names
Lists of people by nickname